Carlos Berlocq was the defending champion but chose not to defend his title.

Kaichi Uchida won the title after defeating Nicolás Álvarez Varona 3–6, 6–3, 7–6(7–3) in the final.

Seeds

Draw

Finals

Top half

Bottom half

References

External links
Main draw
Qualifying draw

Rio Tennis Classic - 1
2021 Singles